Baby Come Out Tonight is the second album by American singer Kathy McCord, released in 1979 by Manhattan Records.

Background 
The tracks collected on the album are re-recorded versions of unreleased songs, some of which will later be released on a second CD of the compilation New Jersey to Woodstock.

The title track was written for Dolly Parton's album Here You Come Again, which was released two years earlier by the same producer.

Track listing

Personnel 
Kat McCord – lead vocals, harmony vocals
Kal David – acoustic guitar, electric guitar, backing vocals
Arti Funaro – acoustic guitar, electric guitar, backing vocals
Hugh McCracken – electric guitar
John Tropea – electric guitar
Jerry Friedman – electric guitar (on track 1)
Paul Harris – piano, organ (on track 3)
Richard Tee – piano
Pat Rebillot – acoustic piano, electric piano (fender rhodes)
Gordon Edwards – bass
Harvey Brooks – bass, acoustic bass (on track 1)
Bob Babbitt – bass (fender) (on track 5)
Bob Leinbach – trombone solo (on track 7), backing vocals
Allan Schwartzberg – drums
Chris Parker – drums
Wells Kelly – drums, congas
Michael Brecker – tenor saxophone (on track 4), horns
Jon Faddis – horns
Lew Del Gatto – horns
Lou Marini – horns
Randy Brecker – horns
Tom Malone – horns
Charlie Calello – arranger (horns), conductor (horns)
Gary Klein – electric piano (fender rhodes) (on track 1), producer

Artistic personnel
Nick Sangiamo – photography
J.J. Stelmach – art direction

Release history

References 

1979 albums
Kathy McCord albums